Delić or Delic (anglicised often to Delich) is a surname popular in former Yugoslavia.

Bosnians

Amer Delić (born 1982), Bosnian-American tennis player
Hazim Delić (born 1964), the Deputy Commander of the Čelebići prison camp, sentenced to 18 years for murder and cruelty
Kada Delić (born 1965), Bosnian race walker
Rasim Delić (1949–2010), Chief of Staff of the Army of the Republic of Bosnia and Herzegovina
Rijad Delić (born 1973), Bosnian volleyball player
Zijad Delic (born 1965), Canadian imam, activist, teacher, executive director of the Canadian Islamic Congress

Croatian/Serbian/Montenegrin

Adrijana Delić (born 1996), Serbian footballer
Ahmet Delić (born 1986), Serbian-Austrian footballer
Božidar Delić (born 1956), retired general of Army of Yugoslavia, current vice president of Serbian parliament
Božidar Đelić (born 1965), Serbian economist and former politician
Ivan Delić (born 1986), Montenegrin footballer currently playing for FK Buducnost Podgorica
Ivan Delić (born 1998), Croatian footballer
Mate Delić (born 1993), Croatian tennis player
Mateas Delić (born 1988), Croatian football midfielder
Mladen Delić (1919–2005), Croatian sports commentator
Nenad Delić (born 1984), Croatian basketball player
Stipe Delić (1925-1999), Croatian film director
Svetozar Delić (1885–1967), the first communist mayor of Zagreb, Croatia
Svemir Delić (1929-2017), Croatian footballer
Uroš Delić (born 1987), Montenegrin professional football player

See also 
Delitzsch (surname)

Bosnian surnames
Croatian surnames
Serbian surnames
Montenegrin surnames